Doña Luisa Pérez de Tagle y Sánchez de Tagle, 4th Marchioness of Altamira (1715–1736) was a Spanish-Mexican aristocrat and a member of the House of Tagle, one of Spain's most influential noble families during the 16th to the 19th century.

Early life 
Doña Luisa was the only daughter of Don Pedro Pérez de Tagle, brother of the Marquess of Las Salinas and Doña Manuela Sánchez de Tagle, who is by her own right the 3rd Marchioness of Altamira. She was born on May 15, 1715 in Vera Cruz, Mexico, and had was baptized on May 23, 1715.

Family 
Doña Luisa succeeded he mother and became the 4th Marchioness of Altamira.
She married Don Juan Rodríguez de Albuerne on 1730. Her husband received from her the hacienda of Cuisillos as dowry and he himself became the Marquess Consort of Altamira. 
In 1737, the King of Spain, Ferdinand VI requested her husband information about the number of patients at the Betlemitas Hospital which led to the creation of the Panteón de Belén years later.
Together, the couple had three children:
 Manuel Rodriguez de Albuerne y Pérez de Tagle who married María de la Paz Girón Moctezuma, a direct descendant of Emperor Moctezuma II, and a member of the family of the Duke of Moctezuma de Tultengo
 Juana Rodríguez de Albuerne y Pérez de Tagle
 Cecilia Rodríguez de Albuerne y Pérez de Tagle who married Domingo Trespalacios Escandón, a judge in the Audiencia of Mexico and a member of the Council of Indies.
She was the third cousin of Ana Manuela Muñíz y Sánchez de Tagle, wife of the powerful nobleman Isidro Huarte y Arrivillaga, parents of Empress Ana Maria of Mexico.

Doña Luisa was succeeded by her son, Don Manuel Rodriguez de Albuerne y Pérez de Tagle as the 5th Marquess of Altamira.

References
 Tagle. Enigma de un nombre, Historia de un pueblo. Author: José Luis Sáiz Fernández
 Nobleza Colonial de Chile. Author: J. Mujica
 Diccionario Heráldico y Genealógico de Apellidos Españoles. Author: Alberto y Arturo García Garrafa
 Nobiliario de los reinos y Señorios de España. Author: Francisco Piferrer
 La Sociedad Chilena del siglo XVIII, Mayorazgos y Títulos de Castilla. Author: Domingo Amunátegui Solar
 Patrons, Partisans, and Palace intrigues: the court society of Colonial Mexico. Author: Christoph Rosenmüller

External links
 http://gw5.geneanet.org/index.php3?b=sanchiz&lang=es;p=luisa;n=perez+de+tagle+sanchez+de+tagle
 http://gw1.geneanet.org/index.php3?b=fracarbo&lang=en;p=jose+bernardo;n=de+tagle+bracho+y+perez+de+la+riva
 https://web.archive.org/web/20090220114504/http://per-can.com/CarpD/deTagle/deTagle.htm#Biografia
 http://www.ianchadwick.com/tequila/16-17th%20centuries.htm

Marquesses of Altamira
1715 births
1736 deaths